A Harlot's Progress (also known as The Harlot's Progress) is a series of six paintings (1731, now destroyed) and engravings (1732) by the English artist William Hogarth. The series shows the story of a young woman, M. (Moll or Mary) Hackabout, who arrives in London from the country and becomes a prostitute. The series was developed from the third image. After painting a prostitute in her boudoir in a garret on Drury Lane, Hogarth struck upon the idea of creating scenes from her earlier and later life. The title and  allegory are reminiscent of John Bunyan's Pilgrim's Progress.

In the first scene, an old woman praises her beauty and suggests a profitable occupation. A gentleman is shown towards the back of the image. In the second image she is with two lovers: a mistress, in the third she has become a  prostitute as well as arrested, she is beating hemp in Bridewell Prison in the fourth. In the fifth scene she is dying from venereal disease, and she is dead at age 23 in the last.

History
The protagonist "M. Hackabout" (see Plate 1, Plate 3, and the coffin-lid in Plate 6, which reads: "M. Hackabout Died Sept 2d 1731 Aged 23") is either named after the heroine of Moll Flanders and Kate Hackabout or ironically after the Blessed Virgin Mary. Kate was a notorious prostitute and the sister of highwayman Francis Hackabout: he was hanged on 17 April 1730; she was convicted of keeping a disorderly house in August the same year, having been arrested by Westminster magistrate Sir John Gonson.

The series of paintings proved to be very popular and Hogarth used his experience as an apprentice to a silversmith to create engravings of the images, selling a "limited edition" of 1,240 sets of six prints to subscribers for a guinea. Pirate copies of the engravings were soon in circulation, and Hogarth procured a 1735 Act of Parliament (8 Geo. II. cap. 13) to prohibit the practice. Soon after, Hogarth published his second series of satirical and moralistic images, A Rake's Progress, followed ten years later by Marriage à-la-mode.

The original paintings were destroyed in a fire at Fonthill House in 1755, the country house of William Beckford (1709–1770), a politician and father of William Thomas Beckford (1 October 1760 – 2 May 1844) builder of Fonthill Abbey in Wiltshire. The original plates survived, and were sold by Hogarth's widow, Jane, to John Boydell in 1789; by him to Baldwin, Cradock and Joy in 1818; and then to Henry Bohn in 1835. Each produced further copies. In 1921, the copperplates were sold by Bernard Quaritch, and they are now in the collection of Edison Dick of Chicago.

Adaptation

British composer Iain Bell composed an operatic adaptation of the work which opened at the Theater an der Wien in Vienna in 2013 with German soprano Diana Damrau in the title role. The world premiere of the opera A Harlot's Progress was on 13 October 2013.

The plates

Legacy
In 1733, John Breval, under the pen-name of Joseph Gay, published a poem  The Lure of Venus: or, a Harlot's Progress. An heroi-comical poem. In six cantos.  Founded upon Mr. Hogarth's six paintings; and illustrated with prints of them.

On 22 June 1828, William Innell Clement published Harlot's Progress in columns on a single page of his newspaper Bell's Life in London #330.

References

External links

 The Harlot's Progress (in Context) 
 The series of engravings
 A Harlot’s Progress von William Hogarth: Aufstieg und Fall einer Hure (with extensive bibliography)
 Ex-Classics edition including the engravings and John Breval's Poem Can be read online or downloaded in various formats.
 The Literary Encyclopedia
 A reprint of the Grub Street Journal, referring to Kate Hackabout
 An analysis
  (2006 film)
 Vienna's New Opera House Since 1801, The New York Times, 29 May 2009

Paintings by William Hogarth
1731 paintings
Painting series
Lost paintings
18th-century engravings
Prints by William Hogarth
Prostitution in paintings
Works about prostitution in the United Kingdom